Nirvana is a concept in Indian religious traditions.

Nirvana may also refer to:

Philosophical concepts 
 Nirvana (Buddhism)
 Moksha (Jainism), the terms Nirvana and Moksha means same in Jainism

Biology 
 Nirvana (leafhopper), a leafhopper genus established by Kirkaldy in 1900
 Nirvana, a butterfly genus established in 1979, now known as Nirvanopsis

Ships 
 USS Nirvana (SP-706), later USS SP-706, a United States Navy patrol vessel in commission in 1917 and from 1918 to 1919
 USS Nirvana II (SP-204), a United States Navy patrol vessel in commission from 1917 to 1918

Music

Bands
 Nirvana (band), an American rock band (1987–1994)
 Nirvana (British band), a British psychedelic band (1967–present)
 Nirvana (Yugoslav band), a Yugoslav progressive rock band (1970–late 1970s)
 Nirvana 2002, a Swedish Death metal band (1988–1991)

Albums 
 Nirvana (Herbie Mann and the Bill Evans Trio album), 1964
 Nirvana (Charles Lloyd album), 1968
 Nirvana (Zoot Sims and Bucky Pizzarelli album), 1974
 Nirvana (Bucky Pizzarelli album), 1995
 Nirvana (Nirvana album), 2002
 Nirvana (Inna album), 2017
 Nirvana (EP), a 2013 EP by Sam Smith

Songs 
 "Nirvana" (song), a 2017 song by Inna
 "Nirvana", a tune by Herbie Mann from the album Nirvana (Herbie Mann and the Bill Evans Trio album), 1964
 "Nirvana", a song by Zoot Sims from the album Nirvana (Zoot Sims and Bucky Pizzarelli album), 1974
 "Nirvana", a song by the Cult from the album Love, 1985
 "Nirvana", a song by Elemeno P from the album Love & Disrespect, 2002
 "Nirvana", a song by Adam Lambert from the album Trespassing, 2012
 "Nirvana", a song by Sam Smith from the record Nirvana (EP), 2013
 "Nirvana", a song by Jelena Rozga from the album Moderna Žena, 2016
 "Nirvana", a 1995 song by the Childrens Choir of Elbosco

Other creative works
 Nirwana, a book compiled by E. L. de Marigny, Jaime Martijn, and Annemarie Kindt, illustrated by Carl Lundgren, and Alicia Austin
 Nirvana (1997 film), an Italian science fiction cyberpunk movie
 Nirvana (2008 film), a Russian drama movie starring Olga Sutulova
 "Nirvana", a poem by Charles Bukowski, first published in 1991

Fictional elements
 Mechanus, also known as Nirvana, a Lawful Neutral spiritually aligned outer plane in Dungeons & Dragons
 Nirvana, a fictional spaceship in the anime series Vandread (ヴァンドレッド, Vandoreddo)
 Nirvana, a magical item in the anime series Fairy Tail (フェアリーテイル, Fearī Teiru) used by the character Oración Seis

Other 
 Mount Nirvana, the unofficial name of the highest mountain in the Northwest Territories, Canada
 NEdit, the "Nirvana editor", a text editor for the X Window System
 Nirvana (software), metadata, data placement and data management software

See also